This article lists governors that have ruled the Indonesian province of North Sumatra.

References 

Governors of North Sumatra
North Sumatra